Colin Smyth (born November 1972) is a Scottish politician who has been a Member of the Scottish Parliament (MSP) for the South Scotland region since 2016. A member of Scottish Labour, he served as its general secretary from 2008 to 2012.

Early life and career 
Smyth was born in 1972. He was raised in Dumfries, where he attended Maxwelltown High School. Prior to entering politics, he worked as a modern studies teacher.

Political career 

Smyth became a Labour party organiser in 2003. In 2008, he was appointed general secretary of the Scottish Labour Party, succeeding Lesley Quinn. In September 2012, Scottish Labour announced that Smyth would step down from the position at the party's conference in the following month.

In 2007, Smyth was elected to Dumfries and Galloway Council, representing the Nith Ward. He was re-elected to this position in 2012. In October 2013, a Labour/SNP coalition was formed on Dumfries and Galloway Council when Smyth was appointed Chair of the Planning, Housing and Environment Committee.

In 2016, Smyth was elected to the Scottish Parliament, as an additional member representing the South Scotland region. He served as Scottish Labour Spokesperson for Transport, Infrastructure and Connectivity under Richard Leonard from 2017 to 2021.

Smyth nominated Anas Sarwar in the 2021 Scottish Labour leadership election. After the leadership election, Sarwar appointed Smyth as Scottish Labour Spokesperson for Constitution, Europe and External Affairs.

Personal life 
Smyth is married to Victoria, an English teacher. Together they have two daughters, Hannah and Evie. He is partly of Northern Irish descent.

References

External links 
 

1972 births
Living people
Place of birth missing (living people)
Scottish Labour councillors
Labour MSPs
Members of the Scottish Parliament 2016–2021
Members of the Scottish Parliament 2021–2026